Word Zapper is an Atari 2600 game written by Henry Will IV and published under the Vidtec label of U.S. Games in 1982. Word Zapper combines spelling exercises with arcade gaming, as the player must shoot letters that scroll across the top of the screen to complete words.

Gameplay
The player controls a spaceship-like "Zapper" which can move about the screen and shoot up, left, and right. The objective is to shoot the letters that spell the current word, in order, while shooting or avoiding asteroids in the lower portion of the screen. There are four types of asteroids, and each has a different effect if it comes into contact with the Zapper. The "Doomsday" asteroid ends the game. The "Scroller" asteroid mixes up the scrolling letters for five seconds. The "Zonker" and "Bonker" asteroids knock the Zapper to the side.

The game ends after being hit by a doomsday asteroid, after the 99 second timer runs down, or the ultimate goal of completing three words.

Reception
Richard A. Edwards reviewed Word Zapper in The Space Gamer No. 59. Edwards commented that "It is difficult to make a statement concerning recommendation. Word Zapper is innovative enough to draw attention at first, but it will depend on the individual gamer whether another arcade shooting match with letters is worth the price tag."

In the 1983 Arcade Awards, Word Zapper was one of two runners-up for the "Most Innovative Videogame" category.

Reviews
Game Freaks 365 Jul 5th, 2010
Woodgrain Wonderland Dec 9th, 2018
The Atari Times Apr 25th, 2014
All Game Guide 1998
HonestGamers (Staff reviews only) Aug 9th, 2008
The Video Game Critic Feb 25th, 2005

References

External links
Word Zapper at Atari Mania

Review in Electronic Fun with Computers & Games

1982 video games
Atari 2600 games
Atari 2600-only games
Single-player video games
U.S. Games games
Video games developed in the United States
Word puzzle video games